The 1916 Wimbledon by-election was held on 19 April 1916.  The by-election was held due to the resignation of the incumbent Conservative MP, Henry Chaplin, when he was raised to the peerage.  It was won by the Conservative candidate Sir Stuart Coats.

References

External links
Newsreel footage of the election (British Film Institute)

Wimbledon by-election
Wimbledon by-election
Wimbledon,1911
Wimbledon,1911
Wimbledon,1916
20th century in Surrey